Cheviot is a town in the Hurunui District of north Canterbury, on the east coast of the South Island of New Zealand.

History and naming
The government under Minister of Lands John McKenzie bought the Cheviot Hills estate between 1892 and 1893 from the descendants of William Robinson. The Cheviot Hills estate was broken into 54 farms and a township, which was originally called McKenzie.  This name was "in widespread use for a decade or two" but gradually fell into disuse.   The Cheviot county council was formed 1895. In 1901 the township had a population of 113.

A large earthquake measuring 6.9 hit near Cheviot on 16 November 1901. A number of buildings were badly damaged and one death was reported.

The post office was always known as Cheviot and by at least 1913 the township too was generally known as Cheviot. Cheviot Hills estate had been named by its original lease holder, John Scott Caverhill, after his home country, the Cheviot Hills straddling the Anglo-Scottish border. 

The Robinson homestead burned down in 1936. Its foundations and grounds became part of the Cheviot Hills Domain, with the homestead's original front steps part of the cricket pavilion.

The Cheviot County rural water supply was opened in 1971. It cost $420,000 and supplies water to an area of 128,000 acres through 190 miles of pipes. A fountain, which sits outside the local school, was built to commemorate the event.

Demographics
It is part of the wider Parnassus statistical area.

Cheviot had a population of 372 at the 2018 New Zealand census, an increase of 6 people (1.6%) since the 2013 census, and a decrease of 18 people (-4.6%) since the 2006 census. There were 177 households. There were 183 males and 186 females, giving a sex ratio of 0.98 males per female, with 60 people (16.1%) aged under 15 years, 39 (10.5%) aged 15 to 29, 144 (38.7%) aged 30 to 64, and 129 (34.7%) aged 65 or older.

Ethnicities were 87.1% European/Pākehā, 21.8% Māori, 4.0% Pacific peoples, 2.4% Asian, and 0.8% other ethnicities (totals add to more than 100% since people could identify with multiple ethnicities).

Although some people objected to giving their religion, 45.2% had no religion, 40.3% were Christian, 0.8% were Muslim and 2.4% had other religions.

Of those at least 15 years old, 18 (5.8%) people had a bachelor or higher degree, and 93 (29.8%) people had no formal qualifications. The employment status of those at least 15 was that 108 (34.6%) people were employed full-time, 63 (20.2%) were part-time, and 9 (2.9%) were unemployed.

The region
Cheviot is a service town for highway traffic and for a pastoral farming district that is currently predominant in sheep farming. Based in the township are a volunteer fire and ambulance services and one full-time police officer.  Surrounding settlements include:

Domett
Originally a railway town, Domett is now only populated by farms and a petrol station.  Next to the Old Main Road/Hurunui Mouth Road junction is the old Domett Railway Station, relocated and refurbished as a cafe.  Domett Service Station provides after-hours sale of fuel (with surcharge): most service stations in the area close around 6pm.

Spotswood
Spotswood has an old hall that is still used regularly, and mainly consists of farms around Waiau East Road.

Parnassus
Parnassus has a higher population than the other settlements, although the local Parnassus School was closed in 2008. The famous Waiau River road/rail bridge was here, before being abandoned and replaced with a new road bridge.  Prior to the opening of the old bridge in the 1930s a ferry across the river carried goods north and south.  The Waiau River ends not far away; however, access to the river mouth must be made over farm property with the owners' permission.  On the State Highway north of Parnassus is Leader Road which leads to the townships of Waiau, Rotherham, Culverden and Hanmer Springs.

Gore Bay

Gore Bay is a surfing beach with summer beach houses and 14 permanent residents. There are two local camping grounds, each with beach access and business. It is a popular New Year's Eve venue.

Of note is Cathedral Gully, a spectacular weathered clay canyon.

Port Robinson

Once a prospering port, Port Robinson is now an abandoned wreck. The old wharf may still be seen, but it is in a dangerous state of disrepair.

Stonyhurst Station
Stonyhurst is a farming station in the Blythe Valley, southwest of Cheviot.

It was founded in 1851 by Frederick Weld and Charles Clifford. He had gained his impression when walking from Lyttelton to Flaxbourne, in Marlborough. Clifford landed sheep on the beach just south of the Blythe River which was later be going to be known as Stonyhurst Station, named after Stonyhurst College in England where they were both educated.

About  was sold in 1863, and a further  a decade later. In about 1900, much of the rest of the land was subdivided. The current station is about one tenth of the original area.

The area is described by the local authority as "a potentially significant natural area", and the manager's cottage is a Category II protected building under the Historic Places Act.

Education

Schooling in Cheviot commenced in 1894. The first school was the McKenzie School, where the A&P Showgrounds are today. The name changed to Cheviot School in 1931. From its inception, the school provided primary education up to Form Two. In 1937, it became the Cheviot District High School.

Cheviot Area School is a composite, co-educational school for Year 1 to 13 students. It also has a wider role providing continuing education, facilities and support for community groups. The closest main contributing school, Parnassus, a year 1-6 school, closed in 2008.

The large oak trees in the school grounds were planted to commemorate those former students who died in World War 2.

Cheviot Area School competes in the Canterbury Area Schools Association Festival sporting competition with schools in Akaroa, Amuri, Hawarden, Oxford, and Rangiora. It also takes part in international exchanges with schools in Japan and Canada.

The township has two preschools, Cheviot Learning Centre and The Tree Hut.

See also
1901 Cheviot earthquake
Manuka Bay

References

External links

Cheviot information  at the Hurunui District Council
Cheviot Promotions Group

Populated places in Canterbury, New Zealand
Hurunui District